Butler Township is a township in Scott County, Iowa, USA.  As of the 2000 census, its population was 3,454.

Geography
According to the USGS, it contains four cemeteries: Fairview, McCausland, Mount Joy and Mount Union.

The streams of Glynn Creek and McDonald Creek run through this township.

Transportation
Butler Township contains one airport or landing strip, Quiet Valley Heliport.

References
 USGS Geographic Names Information System (GNIS)

External links
 US-Counties.com
 City-Data.com

Townships in Scott County, Iowa
Townships in Iowa